The non-marine molluscs of India are a part of the molluscan fauna of India.

There are 5070 species of marine and non-marine molluscs living in the wild in India. There are 3371 species of marine molluscs in India.

There are 1671 species of non-marine molluscs living in the wild in India. This includes 1488 terrestrial species in 140 genera and 183 freshwater species in 53 genera.

There are a total of species of gastropods, which breaks down to ?? species of freshwater gastropods, and 1488 species of land gastropods, plus ?? species of bivalves living in the wild.

Summary table of number of species

Freshwater gastropods 

Neritidae
 Neripteron auriculatum (Lamarck, 1816) Neripteron violaceum (Gmelin, 1791)
 Neritina pulligera (Linnaeus, 1767)
 Neritina platyconcha (Annandale & Prashad, 1919) – subgenus Dostia Neritina perottetiana (Recluz) – subgenus Vittina Neritina smithi (Wood, 1828) – subgenus Vittina Neritina turrita (Gmelin, 1791)
 Neritina variegata Lesson – subgenus Vittina Neritodryas subsulcata (G. B. Sowerby I, 1836)
 Theodoxus bicolor (Récluz, 1843) – subgenus Clithon Theodoxus corona (Linnaeus, 1758) – subgenus Clithon Theodoxus reticularis Sowerby, 1838 – subgenus Clithon Septaria lineata (Lamarck, 1816)
 Septaria porcellana (Linnaeus, 1758)

Viviparidae
 Angulyagra microchaetophora (Annandale, 1921)
 Angulyagra oxytropis (Benson, 1836)
 Taia crassicallosa Annandale & Rao, 1925

Ampullariidae
 Pila globosa (Swainson, 1822) – including varieties incrassatula (Nevill) and minor (Nevill)
 Pila olea (Reeve, 1856)
 Pila conica (Gray, 1828) – including variety compacta Reeve
 Pila theobaldi  Hanley, 1875
 Pila virens (Lamarck, 1822)
 Pila saxea (Reeve, 1856)

Valvatidae
 Valvata piscinalis (O. F. Müller, 1774)

Littorinidae
 Cremnoconchus syhadrensis (Blanford, 1863)
 Cremnoconchus conicus Blanford, 1870 – synonym: Cremnoconchus carinatus (Layard, 1854)
 Mainwaringia paludomoidea (G. Nevill, 1885)

Pomatiopsidae
 Tricula montana (Benson, 1843)

Amnicolidae
 Erhaia nainatalensis Davis & Rao, 1997

Hydrobiidae
 Mysorella costigera (Küster, 1852)

Assimineidae
 Assiminea brevicula Pfeiffer, 1854

Thiaridae
 Paludomus tanschauria Gmelin
 Melanoides tuberculata (O. F. Müller, 1774)
 Plotia scabra (O. F. Müller, 1774)

Lymnaeidae
 Radix luteola (Lamarck, 1822)

Planorbidae
 Anisus convexiusulcus (Benson, 1863) = Gyraulus convexiusulcus (Benson, 1863)
 Indoplanorbis exustus (Deshayes, 1834)

 Land gastropods 

Species of gastropods of India include:Madhyastha N. A. & Kamalesh D. Mumbrekar The land snails of Sharavathi river basin, Karnataka, India.<ref>Mavinkurve R. G., Shanbhag S. P. & Madhyastha N. A. 2004. [http://www.zoosprint.org/ZooPrintJournal/2004/November/1684-1686.pdf Checklist of terrestrial gastropods of Karnataka, India]. Zoos' Print Journal 19(11):1684–1686.</ref>

Assimineidae
 Acmella roepstorffiana Nevill, 1878
 Acmella tersa (Benson, 1853)

Hydrocenidae
 Georissa pyxis (Benson, 1856)

Helicinidae
 Pleuropoma andamanica (Benson, 1860)
 Pleuropoma arakanensis (W. T. Blanford, 1865)
 Pleuropoma dunkeri (Zelebor, 1867)
 Pleuropoma nicobarica (L. Pfeiffer, 1847)
 Pleuropoma rogersi (Bourne, 1911)
 Pleuropoma scrupula (Benson, 1863)
 Sulfurina behniana (Pfeiffer, 1865)
 Sulfurina bensoni  A. J. Wagner, 1907
 Sulfurina zelebori (L. Pfeiffer, 1867)

Achatinidae
 Achatina fulica fulica (Bowdich, 1822)

Camaenidae
 Amphidromus
 Chloritis propinqua  (Pfeiffer, 1857)

Cerastidae
 Rhachis bengalensis (Lamarck, 1822)
 Rhachis praetermissus (Blanford, 1861)
 Rhachis pulcher (Gray, 1825)
 Rhachis punctatus  (Anton, 1839)

Charopidae
 Ruthvenia retifera (Pfeiffer, 1845)

Cyclophoridae
 Alycaeus expatriatus (Blanford, 1860)
 Alycaeus footei (Blanford, 1861)
 Craspedotropis bilirata (Beddome, 1875)
 Craspedotropis cuspidata (Benson, 1851)
 Cyathopoma atrosetosum (Beddome, 1875)
 Cyathopoma filocinctum (Benson, 1851)
 Cyathopoma latilabrie (Beddome, 1875)
 Cyathopoma nitidum (Beddome, 1875)
 Cyathopoma ovatum (Beddome, 1875)
 Cyathopoma trochlea (Benson, 1851)
 Cyathopoma wynaadense  (Blanford, 1868)
 Cyclophorus altivagus (Benson, 1854)
 Cyclophorus bensoni (Pfeiffer, 1854)
 Cyclophorus cryptomphalus Benson, 1857
 Cyclophorus indicus (Deshayes, 1832)
 Cyclophorus malayanus (Benson, 1852)
 Cyclophorus nilagiricus (Benson, 1852)
 Cyclophorus siamensis (Sowerby, 1850)
 Cyclophorus stenomphalus (Pfeiffer, 1846)
 Cyclophorus volvulus (O.F. Müller, 1774)
 Cyclophorus zebrinus (Benson, 1836)
 Leptopomoides valvatus (Mollendroff, 1897)
 Mychopoma seticinctum (Beddome, 1875)
 Pterocyclus bilabiatus (Sowerby, 1843)
 Pterocyclus comatus (Mollendorff, 1897)
 Pterocyclus cyclophoroideus (G. Nevill, 1881)
 Pterocyclus nanus (Benson, 1851)
 Scabrina phenotopicus (Benson, 1851
 Scabrina pinnulifer (Benson, 1857)
 Theobaldius ravidus (Benson, 1851)
 Theobaldius stenostoma (G. B. Sowerby I, 1843)
 Theobaldius tristis (Blanford, 1869)

Pupinidae
 Tortulosa recurvatus (Pfeiffer, 1862)

Diplommatinidae
 Nicida anamullayana (Beddome, 1875)
 Nicida liricincta (Blanford, 1868)
 Nicida nilgirica (Blanford, 1860)
 Nicida nitidula (Blanford, 1868)
 Nicida subovata (Beddome, 1875)
 Opisthostoma deccanense (Beddome, 1875)
 Opisthostoma fairbanki (Blanford, 1866)
 Ophisthostoma macrostoma (Blanford, 1869)
 Diplommatina canarica (Beddome, 1875)

Endodontidae
 Philalanka bidenticulata (Benson, 1852)
 Philalanka daghoba (Blanford, 1861)
 Philalanka quinquilirata (Gude, 1914)
 Thysanota guerini (Pfeiffer, 1842)
 Ruthvenia retifera (Pfeiffer, 1845)

Enidae
 Ena

Staffordiidae – this family lives only in India
 Staffordia daflaensis (Godwin-Austen)
 Staffordia staffordi (Godwin-Austen)
 Staffordia toruputuensis Godwin-Austen

Helicarionidae
 Kaliella barrackporensis (Pfeiffer, 1852)
 Kaliella sigurensis (Godwin-Austen, 1882)
 Sitala liricincta (Stolickzka, 1871)
 Sitala palmaria (Benson, 1864)
 Sitala denselirata (Preston, 1908)

Ariophantidae
 Ariophanta canarica (Blanford, 1901)
 Ariophanta cysis (Benson, 1852)
 Ariophanta immerita (Blanford, 1870)
 Ariophanta interrupta (Benson, 1834)
 Ariophanta kadapaensis (Nevill, 1878)
 Ariophanta thyreus (Benson, 1852)
 Cryptozona albata (Blanford, 1880) (subgenus Xestina)
 Cryptozona belangeri (Deshayes, 1834) (subgenus Xestina)
 Cryptozona bistrialis (Beck) (subgenus Xestina)
 Cryptozona ligulata (Ferussac, 1821)
 Cryptozona maderaspatana (Gray, 1834) (subgenus Nilgiria)
 Cryptozona semirugata (Beck, 1837) (subgenus Nilgiria)
 Cryptozona sisparica (Blanford, 1866)
 Cryptozona solata (Benson, 1848)
 Euplecta acuducta (Benson, 1850)
 Euplecta cacuminifera (Benson, 1850)
 Euplecta fluctuosa (Blanford, 1901)
 Euplecta hyphasma (Pfeiffer, 1853)
 Euplecta granulifera (Blanford, 1901)
 Euplecta indica (Pfeiffer, 1846)
 Euplecta mucronifera (H. Adams, 1869)
 Euplecta semidecussata (Pfeiffer, 1851)
 Euplecta subdecussata (Pfeiffer, 1857)
 Euplecta travancorica (Benson, 1865)
 Hemiplecta beddomii (Blanford, 1874)
 Macrochlamys aulopsis (Benson, 1863)
 Macrochlamys indica Benson, 1832
 Macrochlamys lixa (Blanford, 1866)
 Macrochlamys prava (Blanford, 1904)
 Macrochlamys vilipensa (Benson, 1853)
 Macrochlamys woodiana (Pfeiffer, 1851)
 Indrella ampulla (Benson, 1850)

 Mariaella beddomei (Godwin-Austen, 1888)
 Mariaella dussumieri (Gray, 1855)

Pupillidae
 Pupilla

Pyramidulidae
 Pyramidula

Streptaxidae
 Streptaxis canaricus (Blanford, 1869)
 Streptaxis concinnus (Blanford, 1880)
 Streptaxis peroteti (Petit, 1841)
 Streptaxis scalptus (Blanford, 1899)
 Streptaxis subacutus (Blanford, 1899)
 Gluella canarica (Blanford, 1880)
 Gluella exilis (Blanford, 1880)
 Gluella turricula (Blanford, 1899)
 Huttonella bicolor (Hutton)
 Ennea
 Perrottetia rajeshgopali Bhosale, Thackeray & Rowson, 2021

Diapheridae
 Sinoennea Kobelt, 1904

Succineidae
 Succinea baconi (Pfeiffer, 1854)
 Succinea gravelyi Rao, 1924
 Succinea raoi (Subba Rao & Mitra, 1976)
 Succinea subgranosa (Pfeiffer, 1849)

Subulinidae

 Opeas gracilis (Hutton, 1834)
 Subulina octona (Bruguière, 1789)
 Zootecus insularis (Ehrenberg, 1831)
 Glessula canarica (Beddome, 1906)
 Glessula chessoni (Benson, 1860)
 Glessula inornata (Pfeiffer, 1851)
 Glessula mullorum (Blanford, 1861)
 Glessula oreas (Reeve, 1850)
 Glessula orophila (Reeve, 1849)
 Glessula perrotteti (Pfeiffer, 1842)
 Glessula pseudoreas (Nevill, 1881)
 Glessula subserena (Beddome, 1906)
 Glessula tenuispira (Benson, 1836)
 Glessula textilis (Blanford, 1866)
 Glessula tornensis (Blanford, 1870)
 Lamellaxis gracile (Hutton, 1834)
 Zootecus chion (Pfeiffer, 1856)

Valloniidae
 Vallonia

Veronicellidae
 Vaginula alte Férussac, 1821 =? Laevicaulis alte (Férussac, 1822)
 Filicaulis (Lavecaulis) frauenfeldi (Semper, 1885) = Vaginula frauenfeldi Semper, 1885

Vertiginidae
 Pupisoma evezardi (Blanford, 1875)

Pleurodontidae
 Planispira fallaciosa (Férussac, 1821)
 Planispira nilagerica (Pfeiffer, 1845)
 Planispira vittata (Muller, 1774)

unsorted:

 Lithotis rupicola
 Diplommantina
 Apatetes
 Corilla
 Edouardia
 Eurychlamys
 Microcystina
 Prosopeas
 Pupoides
 Bifidaria
 Micraulax
 Pearsonia
 Pseudaustenia
 Cyclotopsis
 Thysanota
 Planispira
 Rachisellus
 Satiella
 Cerastus

See also
 List of marine molluscs of India
 List of non-marine molluscs of Pakistan
 List of non-marine molluscs of China
 List of non-marine molluscs of Nepal
 List of non-marine molluscs of Bhutan
 List of non-marine molluscs of Bangladesh
 List of non-marine molluscs of Myanmar
 List of non-marine molluscs of Sri Lanka
 List of non-marine molluscs of Maldives
 List of non-marine molluscs of Indonesia

References

Further reading
(sorted chronologically)
 Henry Haversham Godwin-Austen 1920. Land and freshwater mollusca of India, including South Arabia, Baluchistan, Afghanistan, Kashmir, Nepal, Burmah, Pegu, Tenasserim, Malay Peninsula, Ceylon, and other islands of the Indian Ocean, supplementary to Messrs. Theobald and Hanley's Conchologia Indica. Volume III. Taylor & Francis, London. – The volume III. include Glessula species only.
 1908–1915. The Fauna of British India including Ceylon and Burma. Mollusca.
 Satyamurti S. T. 1960. Land and freshwater mollusca in the collection of the Madras Government museum. Natural History Section New Series, Vol. VI, No.4., 174 pp.
 Raut S. K. & Ghose K.C. 1984. Pestiferous land snails of India. Technical Monograph No. 11 Zool. Surv. India, 1–151.
 Subba Rao, N.V., Thakur D. K. & Mitra S. C. 1989. Mollusca (Terrestrial). Fauna of Orissa Part – II. State fauna Series: 1 Ed: Director, Zoological Survey of India P., 253–276.
 Subba Rao N.V. & Mitra S. C. 1993. Land Molluscs of Andaman and Nicobar Islands. Rec. Zool. Surv. India, Occ. Paper No. 126, 88 pp.
 H. Nesemann, S. Gopaö & K. S. Ravindra (2003) The Bivalvia of the Ganga River and adjacent stagnant water bodies in Patna (Bihar, India) with special reference on Unionacea. Acta Conchyliorum, 43 pages, include 9 tables, 31 figures.
 S. C. Mitra, A. Dey & Ramakrishna (2005) Pictorial handbook: Indian land snails . 4 + 344 pp.
 Nesemann H. & Sharma S., Sharma G., Khanal S. N., Pradhan B., Shah D. N. & Tachamo R. D. (2007) Aquatic Invertebrates of the Ganga River System, Vol. 1. (Mollusca, Annelida, Crustacea), 263 pp., 76 (12 colour) plates with 748 figures. .
 Ramakrishna & A. Dey (2007) Indian Freshwater Molluscs. 399 pp., 279 color figures in text, hardcover.

External links
 Sahyadri: Western Ghats Biodiversity Information System. issue 20. Mollusca.
 https://web.archive.org/web/20090717093156/http://www.wii.gov.in/envis/rain_forest/chapter9.htm

Lists of fauna of India
India
India